Seyhan Rotary Anatolian High School was established on August 29, 1996, at Yüreğir, Adana by Seyhan Rotary Club. The principal of the school is Abdussamed Emiroğulları. Education languages of school are English, Turkish and German.

External links 
 Seyhan Rotary Anadolu Lisesi Official Web Page (Turkish)

High schools in Adana
Educational institutions established in 1996
1996 establishments in Turkey
Anatolian High Schools